In Greek mythology, Pammon (Ancient Greek: Πάμμων) was a Trojan prince and one of the sons of King Priam of Troy and Hecuba. He was killed by Achilles' son Neoptolemus during the Trojan War.

Family 
According to Pseudo-Apollodorus, King Priam had nine sons and four daughters by Hecuba; the sons being Hector, Paris, Deiphobus, Helenus, Pammon, Polites, Antiphus, Hipponous, Polydorus, and the daughters Creusa, Laodice, Polyxena, and the prophetess Cassandra. He also names thirty-eight sons by other women, including Troilus, Hippothous, Kebriones, Gorgythion, and Antiphonus.

Mythology 
Pammon was chosen by Eurypylus of Mysia, along with Alexander, Aeneas, Polydamas, Deiphobus and Aethicus, as a commander to lead the Trojan host after the death of Hector. During the siege of Troy, Pammon together with his brothers Polites and Antiphonus, was killed by Neoptolemus, Achilles' son.

See also
 List of children of Priam

Notes

References 

 Homer, The Iliad with an English Translation by A.T. Murray, Ph.D. in two volumes. Cambridge, MA., Harvard University Press; London, William Heinemann, Ltd. 1924. Online version at the Perseus Digital xLibrary.
 Homer, Homeri Opera in five volumes. Oxford, Oxford University Press. 1920. Greek text available at the Perseus Digital Library.
 Pseudo-Apollodorus, The Library with an English Translation by Sir James George Frazer, F.B.A., F.R.S. in 2 Volumes, Cambridge, MA, Harvard University Press; London, William Heinemann Ltd. 1921. Online version at the Perseus Digital Library. Greek text available from the same website.
 Quintus Smyrnaeus, The Fall of Troy translated by Way. A. S. Loeb Classical Library Volume 19. London: William Heinemann, 1913. Online version at theio.com
 Quintus Smyrnaeus, The Fall of Troy. Arthur S. Way. London: William Heinemann; New York: G.P. Putnam's Sons. 1913. Greek text available at the Perseus Digital Library.

Trojans
Children of Priam
Princes in Greek mythology